Louise Closser Hale (October 13, 1872 – July 26, 1933) was an American actress, playwright, and novelist.

Early life 
Louise Closser was born in Chicago, Illinois, on October 13, 1872. Her father was Joseph Closser, a grain dealer, and her mother was Louise Paddock Closser. She had two sisters, Belle and Myla Jo. Hale studied at the American Academy of Dramatic Arts and at the Boston School of Oratory.

Career

Acting
Hale made her theatrical debut in Detroit in an 1894 production of In Old Kentucky. She initially acted with touring troupes in the Midwest. Her Broadway debut was in Arizona (1900). Her first theatrical success came in 1903, when she appeared in a Broadway production of George Bernard Shaw's Candida. In 1907, she made her London debut in Mrs. Wiggs of the Cabbage Patch.

Twelve years after her husband's death in 1917, Hale began working in Hollywood. Her first film was The Hole in the Wall (1929). Also in 1929, she reprised her role as Cora Sabbot in the film version of the Broadway play Paris. During her four years in Hollywood, she worked for Columbia, Fox, Paramount, RKO, and Warner Bros. studios and performed in 30 films. She usually appeared "as a motherly or grandmotherly figure".

Writing
Hale had a parallel career as an author and playwright, starting in the first decade of the 20th century. She co-wrote the play Mother's Millions and was a correspondent for Harper's Magazine during World War I. Her books included Home Talent and An American's London. She also was an associate editor for The Smart Set magazine. Her published work exceeded 10 books and 100 short stories.

Personal life 
In 1899, Closser married artist and actor Walter Hale, whose name she used for her stage career, and who illustrated a number of her travel books. She collaborated with him in the preparation of many travel works for which they traveled extensively. The union was childless. 

Closser Hale was one of the founders of the Stage Women's War Relief during World War I.

Death
Hale was overcome by heat while shopping in Hollywood, California, on July 25, 1933, and she died following a heart attack at Monte Sano Hospital on July 26, 1933, aged 60. In her will, Hale requested an Episcopalian funeral service as simple and as inexpensive as possible. She directed that at the close of the service her body be cremated and that "no friend or kin accompany the body further than the church door." The will also said, "If I live in the memory of my friends, I shall have lived long enough." She left her estate to relatives and charities. Her body was cremated and the ashes were interred in Hollywood Forever Cemetery.

Partial filmography

 The Hole in the Wall (1929) - Mrs. Ramsay
 Paris (1929) - Cora Sabbot
 Dangerous Nan McGrew (1930) - Mrs. Benson
 Big Boy (1930) - Mother
 The Princess and the Plumber (1930) - Miss Eden
 Captain Applejack (1931) - Aunt Agatha
 Born to Love (1931) - Lady Ponsonby
 Daddy Long Legs (1931) - Miss Pritchard
 Rebound (1931) - Mrs. Jaffrey
 Devotion (1931) - Mrs. Emmet Mortimer
 Platinum Blonde (1931) - Mrs. Schuyler
 Shanghai Express (1932) - Mrs. Haggerty
 The Man Who Played God (1932) - Florence Royle
 Sky Bride (1932) - Mrs. (Ma) Smith
 Letty Lynton (1932) - Miranda, Letty's Maid
 New Morals for Old (1932) - Mrs. Warburton
 Rebecca of Sunnybrook Farm (1932) - Aunt Miranda
 Movie Crazy (1932) - Mrs. Kitterman
 Faithless (1932) - First Landlady
 No More Orchids (1932) - Grandma Holt
 Rasputin and the Empress (1932) - Lazy Spoiled Woman (uncredited)
 The Son-Daughter (1932) - Toy Yah
 Today We Live (1933) - Applegate
 The White Sister (1933) - Mina Bernardo
 The Barbarian (1933) - Powers
 Storm at Daybreak (1933) - Militza Brooska
 Another Language (1933) - Mother Hallam
 Dinner at Eight (1933) - Hattie Loomis
 Duck Soup (1933) - Reception Guest (uncredited)

References

External links

 
 
 portraits(NY Public Library, Billy Rose collection)
 Louise Closser Hale, sitting with black band around neck circa 1906 with actor colleagues at the Nantucket home "Aloha" of Henry Woodruff, center with cigar. 
  findagrave

American film actresses
20th-century American novelists
American women novelists
19th-century American actresses
American stage actresses
20th-century American actresses
Emerson College alumni
1872 births
1933 deaths
American women dramatists and playwrights
20th-century American women writers
20th-century American dramatists and playwrights
American Episcopalians